The name Weeks is an uncommon English surname, usually either a patronymic of the Middle English Wikke ("battle, war") or a topographic or occupational name deriving from Wick ("small, outlying village"). It may also be an Anglification of the Scandinavian habitational name Vik ("small bay, inlet").

Derivation
Weeks is an English surname of Germanic origin with several known derivations:
A patronymic from the Middle English personal name Wikke, which is in turn a short form of any of various Germanic personal names formed with the element wig, meaning battle, war.
A variant of Wick, which is an English topographic name for someone who lived in an outlying settlement dependent on a larger village; from the Old English wic an early loan word from the Latin vicus, or a habitational name from a place named with this word. Examples of such places include Week Green in Cornwall, and Wick in Somerset. As the term was especially used to denote an outlying dairy farm or salt works, it may also have been an occupational name for someone who worked at such a facility. The addition of a final "s" to topographical and locational surnames was a usual medieval practice, denoting one who was resident at a place, rather than from it.
An Anglification of the Scandinavian Vik, itself either a habitational name from any of the numerous Norwegian or Swedish farmsteads named with Old Norse vík, meaning small bay, inlet, or (in Swedish) a topographic or ornamental name. An example of this is the Scottish Highland town of Wick, ( or )

Early instances
Early bearers of the surname include: 
Alueredus de Uuica of Somerset in 1084.
Goscelin del Wich of Worcestershire in 1184.
Jordan de la Wike of Gloucestershire in 1194.
 
Later recordings include:
Symon Weeks, of Devonshire, a worsted weaver born in 1618, who emigrated to Barbados in February 1634 aged only 16. He is currently known to be the first person with the surname Weeks or etymologies of it to travel to the new world thus becoming a common ancestor to many with the name or derivatives of it in North America.
Benjamin Weich of London, who married Aurrelia Clarke at St James Clerkenwell, on 21 September 1653.
Henry Witch of London who married Ann Rugrove at St Olaves, Southwark, on 26 June 1774.

Cognates and variations
Names etymologically related to Weeks include but may not be limited to: Weekes, Wicks, Weech, Week, Weeke, Wich, Wych, Weetch, Wick, Wickes, Wix, Wike, Witch, Wykes, Whick, and Vik.

Frequency and distribution
In the UK, at the time of the 1881 Census, the relative frequency of Weeks was highest in Devon (7.3 times the British average), followed by Wiltshire, Somerset, Hampshire, Brecknockshire, Gloucestershire, Monmouthshire, Kent and Dorset.

Today the name is most common (indicated in frequency per million) in Australia (188), the United States (181), the United Kingdom (156), Canada (143), and New Zealand (71).

Globally, the city with the largest numbers of people named Weeks is Bristol, United Kingdom, located in the south western county of Somerset.

In the US, there were 51,976 people in 1990 with the last name Weeks, making it the 675th most common last name. The table below compares this with the corresponding enumerations of related names at that time in the US.

Notable people with the surname 
 Alan Weeks (1923–1996), British television sports reporter and commentator
 Bert Weeks (1918–1990), mayor of Windsor, Ontario, Canada, from 1975 to 1982
 Bob Weeks (born 1960), editor of Scoregolf magazine
 Brent Weeks, writer of fantasy books including best-selling The Night Angel trilogy.
 David Weeks, former Conservative Leader of Westminster City Council
 Don Weeks (1938–2015), longtime host of the WGY Morning News in Schenectady, New York
 Don Weeke (born 1947), American fiber and gourd artist
 Edgar Weeks (1839–1904), military officer, judge and politician from Michigan
 Edwin Lord Weeks (1849–1903), American artist
 Ezra Weeks, builder who served as a witness in a sensationalized murder trial
 Frank B. Weeks (1854–1935), Governor of Connecticut
 George Weeks (disambiguation)
 Harriet Hilreth Weeks (1875-1939), American politician
 Hilary Weeks, singer/songwriter of faith-based music
 Honeysuckle Weeks (born 1979), British actress, best known for her starring role as Samantha Stewart in the British TV series Foyle's War
 James Weeks (disambiguation)
 Janet Healy Weeks (born 1932), American lawyer and judge
 Jeffrey Weeks, American mathematician and MacArthur Fellow
 Jeffrey Weeks, British historian, sociologist, and gay activist
 Jemile Weeks, Major League Baseball second baseman for the Oakland Athletics, brother of Rickie Weeks
 John Weeks (disambiguation)
 Joseph Weeks (1773–1845), United States Representative from New Hampshire
 Kent R. Weeks (born 1941), American Egyptologist
 Kermit Weeks (born 1953), aviation enthusiast, owner of very large historic aviation collection and museum
 Kevin Weeks (born 1956), former mobster 
 Laurie Weeks (rugby union), (born 1986), professional rugby union footballer
 Laurie Weeks (writer), writer and performer based in New York City
 Lee Weeks, American comic book artist and penciller
 Lloyd F. Weeks (1932–2002), Michigan politician
 Levi Weeks (1776–1819), the accused in the infamous Manhattan Well Murder trial of 1800
 Miriam Weeks (born 1995) American pornstar
 Orlando Weeks (born 1983), lead singer and guitarist of London-based band The Maccabees
 Perdita Weeks (born 1985), British actress
 Ray Weeks (1930–2015), English cricketer
 Raymond Weeks (1863–1954), American linguist and academic
 Rickie Weeks (born 1982), Major League Baseball second baseman for the Milwaukee Brewers, brother of Jemile Weeks
 Rollo Weeks (born 1987), British actor
 Romilly Weeks (born 1973), English newsreader and journalist
 Russ Weeks (born 1942), former Republican State Senator from West Virginia
 Sinclair Weeks (1893–1972), United States Secretary of Commerce under Dwight Eisenhower
 Steve Weeks (born 1958), retired ice hockey goaltender
 Theophilus Weeks (1708–1772), soldier in the French and Indian War and founder of Swansboro, North Carolina
 Thompson Weeks, Wisconsin politician
 William Henry Weeks (1864–1936), American architect who designed many public buildings in California
 Willie Weeks (born 1947), American bassist
 Christopher Weeks (born 1987), Chef, American Bassist, African American Descendant of Leonard Weeks

See also
Weekes (disambiguation)
List of people with surname Wicks
Wick (surname)
Weekes
Wicks (disambiguation)
Weeks (disambiguation)

References 

Surnames
English-language surnames
Surnames of English origin
Lists of people by surname